The Catholic Church and politics concerns the interplay of Catholicism with religious, and later secular, politics. Historically, the Church opposed liberal ideas such as democracy, freedom of speech, and the separation of church and state under the grounds that "error has no rights" . Eventually accommodated these ideas and began to view religious liberty as a positive value during and after the Second Vatican Council.

Background
According to the United States Conference of Catholic Bishops, "the separation of church and state does not require division between belief and public action, between moral principles and political choices, but protects the right of believers and religious groups to practice their faith and act on their values in public life."

19th century
As a program and a movement, political Catholicism – a political and cultural conception which promotes the ideas and social teaching of the Catholic Church in public life through government action – was started by Prussian Catholics in the second half of the 19th century. They were responding to the secular social measures of Chancellor Otto von Bismarck to limit the influence of Catholic Church, first in Prussia, and then in united Germany, a struggle known as the Kulturkampf.

From Germany, political Catholic social movements spread in Austria-Hungary, especially in today's Austria, Ukraine, Slovenia and Croatia. Catholic Action was the name of many groups of lay Catholics attempting to encourage Catholic influence on political society.

Political changes in Spain during the second half of the nineteenth century led to the development of Catholic Integrism and Carlism struggling against a separation of Church and State. The clearest expression of this struggle arose around the 1884 publication of the book Liberalism is a Sin by Roman Catholic priest Félix Sardà y Salvany. The book was rapidly referred to Rome, where it received a positive, albeit cautious welcome.

Pope Leo XIII's 1891 encyclical Rerum novarum (Of New Things) gave political Catholic movements an impulse to develop and to spread the area of their involvement. With this encyclical, the Catholic Church expanded its interest in social, economic, political and cultural issues, and it called for a drastic conversion of Western society in the 19th century in the face of capitalist influences. Following the release of the document, the labour movement which had previously floundered began to flourish in Europe, and later in North America. Mary Harris Jones ("Mother Jones") and the National Catholic Welfare Council were central in the campaign to end child labour in the United States during the early 20th century.

Catholic movements in the 20th century

In the 20th century, Catholic political movements became very strong in Spain, Italy, Germany, Austria, Ireland, France and Latin America. What these movements had in common was a defense of the acquired rights of the Catholic Church (attacked by anticlerical politicians) and a defense of Christian faith and moral values (threatened by increasing secularization). Opponents called such efforts clericalism.

These Catholic movements developed various forms of Christian democratic ideology, generally promoting socially and morally conservative ideas such as traditional family values and a culture of life while supporting alternatives such as distributism to both unrestrained capitalism and state socialism. Freemasons were seen mainly as enemies and vehement opponents of political Catholicism. In Mexico, the atheist President Plutarco Elías Calles repressed the Church and Catholics, leading to the Cristero War that lasted from 1926 to 1929.

Some of the earliest important political parties were:

Conservative Catholic Party of Switzerland – 1848
Catholic Party (Belgium) – 1869
Centre Party (Germany) – with origins in 1870
Christian Social Party (Austria) – 1893
Popular Liberal Action in France – 1901
General League of Roman Catholic Caucuses (Netherlands) – 1904, reorganized as the Roman Catholic State Party in 1926
Slovak People's Party – 1918
Croatian Popular Party – 1919
Italian People's Party – 1919
Polish Christian Democratic Party – 1919
Bavarian People's Party – 1919
National League for the Defense of Religious Liberty in Mexico – 1924
Democratic Labour Party (Australia) - 1955

Most of these parties in Europe joined together in the White International (1922), in opposition to the Communist International. Franco's mixture of Catholicism and nationalism received its own brand of National Catholicism and it inspired similar movements throughout Europe.

In addition to political parties, Catholic/Christian trade unions were created, which fought for worker's rights: the earliest include:

Typographic Workers Trade Union in Spain (1897);
Solidarity in South Africa (1902);
Confederation of Christian Trade Unions in Belgium (1904);
Catholic Workers Union in  Mexico (1908);
International Federation of Christian Trade Unions (IFCTO), in The Hague in 1920 (which was preceded by the International Secretariat of Christian Trade Unions founded in Zürich in 1908, led through the World Confederation of Labour (WCL) to today's International Trade Union Confederation (ITUC));
French Confederation of Christian Workers (1919);
Luxembourg Confederation of Christian Trade Unions (1921);
Canadian Catholic Federation of Labour (1921)
Young Christian Workers in Belgium (1924);
Catholic Worker Movement in the USA (from 1933).

After World War II, more such unions were formed, including:

Italian Confederation of Workers' Trade Unions (from 1950);
Christian Trade Union Federation of Germany (from 1959);
Christian Workers' Union in Belize (from 1963);
Solidarity in Poland (from 1980).

Until the Second Vatican Council, the Church did not always accept the model of modern democracy and its expansion into social and economic realms because it was wary of anticlerical socialistic tendencies. When Catholic social activists were perceived to be too extreme in social conflicts, the Church hierarchy tried to restrain their excesses; this included the Worker-priest movement in France in the 1940s and 50s, and liberation theology in Latin America in the 60s, 70s, and 80s. But some movements were strongly supported by the Church - in Australia the Catholic Social Studies Movement during the 40s and 50s, from which the National Civic Council developed.

Following the council, the Catholic church became linked to democratization movements in both developed and developing countries, opposing authoritarianism and advocating for human rights. However, this was not universal, and the extent of church involvement in politics varied greatly between countries. Catholic clergy and lay activists sometimes tended to support far-right leaders such Francisco Franco and António de Oliveira Salazar, as well as the military regimes in Latin America. As a result, many workers involved in the labor movement joined social democratic and communist parties, which were mostly secular and called for revolution against old values, including religion and the Church.

Concordats

In dealing with hostile regimes, the Church has sometimes signed concordats, formal treaties which limit persecution of Catholic practices in return for concessions to the state. The Concordat of 1801, signed with Napoleon, reduced the persecution endured under the French Revolution in return for Church cooperation with Napoleon's rule. The Lateran Treaty of 1929 settled long-running disputes with Italy by recognising the independence of the Vatican City. The 1933 Reichskonkordat with the emergent Nazi Germany required clergy non-involvement in politics while allowing public practice of the Catholic faith. Similar purposes were served by the 2018 Holy See-China agreement which allowed Chinese government recommendation of bishops' appointments while permitting some practice of the faith.

United States
During the 1930s in America, Father Coughlin, initially a left-wing radical supporter of FDR’s New Deal, Catholic priest and radio firebrand, expounded an anti-communist, social justice platform influenced by the Catholic faith. Coughlin later excoriated the Democratic Party, taking on an increasingly illiberal and anti-Semitic stance. The Catholic Church denounced Couglin's rhetoric for its anti-Semitism and hostility towards trade unions.  The Archbishop of Detroit, Edward Aloysius Mooney, demanded Coughlin to cease his attacks on industrial unions such as the Congress of Industrial Organizations.

The Catholic Church encouraged Catholic workers to join the CIO "to improve their economic status and to act as a moderating force in the new labor movement". Catholic clergy promoted and founded moderate trade unions, such as the Association of Catholic Trade Unionists and the Archdiocesan Labor Institute in 1939. American Catholics of that era were generally New Deal liberals who actively supported the CIO, viewed government as a positive force for social reform and often participated in non-communist trade unions, becoming a prominent group of the United Auto Workers. According to Colleen Doody, Catholics were the "backbone and the bane of New Deal liberalism".

Catholics are instructed to participate in the political process, be informed voters, and to encourage elected officials to act on behalf of the common good. There are, however, limits to official Church political activity. The Church engages in issue-related activity, but avoids partisan political candidate activities. This restriction does not apply to individuals or group provided they do not represent themselves as acting in an official Church capacity.

Every four years, the USCCB produces "Forming Consciences for Faithful Citizenship" (formerly "Faithful Citizenship") guides, to provide guidelines and explanations of Catholic teaching to Catholic voters.

See also

Notes

References
 
 
 
 
 

 
Catholic social teaching
Catholic theology and doctrine
Christianity and political ideologies